Newman Leopold Steiner was a Canadian businessman, politician, and justice of the peace. He was the first Jew to hold municipal office in Toronto.

Steiner was born in Bavaria to Francisca and Wolfgang Steiner. He joined the revolution against the Austrian Empire in 1848, leaving for North America shortly thereafter. He lived in New York and Buffalo before settling in Toronto in 1852, establishing there a stone-cutting and marble dealing business. He became a justice of the peace in 1870, and in 1880 was elected alderman of St. John's Ward, a position he held for five terms.

References

1829 births
1903 deaths
Canadian justices of the peace
Canadian Freemasons
Jews and Judaism in Toronto
Businesspeople from Toronto
Toronto city councillors
Jewish Canadian politicians
Canadian people of German-Jewish descent